The 2018 BMW PGA Championship was the 64th edition of the BMW PGA Championship, an annual golf tournament on the European Tour, held 24–27 May at the West Course of Wentworth Club in Virginia Water, Surrey, England, a suburb southwest of London.

Course layout

Field

Past champions in the field

Made the cut

Missed the cut

Nationalities in the field

Round summaries

First round
Thursday, 24 May 2018

Second round
Friday, 25 May 2018

Third round
Saturday, 26 May 2018

Final round
Sunday, 27 May 2018

References

External links
Coverage on European Tour official site
Wentworth Club: Golf

BMW PGA Championship
Golf tournaments in England
BMW PGA Championship
BMW PGA Championship
BMW PGA Championship